Jürgen Melzer was the defending champion but chose not to defend his title.

Vasek Pospisil won the title after defeating Nicola Kuhn 7–6(7–3), 3–6, 6–3 in the final.

Seeds

Draw

Finals

Top half

Bottom half

References
Main Draw
Qualifying Draw

Hungarian Challenger Open - Singles